Hoste may refer to:

Places 
 Hoste, Galanta District, a village in the Trnava Region (Galanta District) of Slovakia
 Hoste, Moselle, a commune in the Moselle département of France
 Hoste (island), an island in the Magallanes y la Antártica Chilena Region of Chile

People 

James Hoste (Castle Rising MP) (1633–1699), English politician
James Hoste (Bramber MP) (1705–1744), English politician
Paul Hoste (1652–1700), French Jesuit priest and naval tactician
William Hoste (1780–1828), English officer in the Royal Navy
George Charles Hoste (1786–1845), English officer in the British Army

Ships 
 , the name of more than one Royal Navy ship
 , the name of more than one United States Navy ship

Terms 
 Hueste, Portuguese designation of the medieval armies of the Iberian Peninsula

ca:Hoste